Sanctuary is a 2015 German drama film directed by Marc Brummund. It was one of eight films shortlisted by Germany to be their submission for the Academy Award for Best Foreign Language Film at the 88th Academy Awards, but it lost out to Labyrinth of Lies.

Plot

In the summer of 1968, the 14-year-old Wolfgang from Osnabrück, who liked to tinker with mopeds, is defiant to his stepfather. When Wolfgang shows his friends the paternal pornography magazine, the latter lets him through a staff member of the Youth Office Osnabrück to a Christian educational center in Freistatt. His mother comforts him and promises to take him back at Christmas. He takes a picture of his mother to Freistatt.

He is greeted seemingly friendly by the housefather Brockmann in his garden. He interrupts his gardening and reads out loudly from Wolfgang's juvenile acts. As a result of this, the Youth Office noted that Wolfgang was "aggressive", "renitent" and "disobedient" and had fled from the Heidequell school near Bielefeld after three months. He defended himself by saying that he had always defended himself and had never become violent. The father of the house takes a sheet from Wolfgang's file and folds a planter from it.

The life in the home is, however, the same as in a barrack. The leaders are called as "brother" as usual among "good Christians". The housefather, who is quite fierce in his dealings with his pupils advocates, leads the establishment, according to his own data, for 25 years, so since 1943.

When Wolfgang is used for Mattis, the weaker pupil, who is to be punished by Bernd, the "ranks of the group," he is punished by him. The Afro-German Anton takes contact with Wolfgang and tells him that he is also from Osnabrück.

Wolfgang has to work with the other pupils to the hard work in the peat mire. When he complains that he is going to get boots in two months, he is beaten with a spade by Brother Wilde, one of the two guardians. A first escape attempt fails in the confusing mire area. In the case of misconduct, the householder allows the group to collectively punish the group, for example by rationing the food or a smoking ban. He leaves it to the pupils to personally punish the "guilty one", and then comforts it afterwards. Since Wolfgang does not like anything, he still has conflicts with Bernd, who asks him to stick to the rules for the benefit of the group.

Wolfgang hands a letter to Angelika, the daughter of the house father, asking his mother to take him out of the home because he can not stand it anymore. She claims to her father that she had been approached by Wolfgang, but she accepts the letter. Later the housefather finds the letter; The group will be punished with food deprivation. Wolfgang tries to steal tomatoes from the father's garden, but is discovered by him and submerged in the water barrel until shortly before drowning. Since he snubs Brother Wilde by still harvesting and eating tomatoes, he was beaten with the baton, but impressed by his unbrokenness of the group.

Wolfgang is sent a "Hedgehog slice" by his mother for a birthday. Already when he was picked up by the youth office, she had given him one. The householder keeps him for himself and eats what the boy is discovering. Bernd tries to take Wolfgang's hopes of returning to his parents' home and lights up the photo of Wolfgang's mother.

During the recreation, there was an uprising against Brother Wilde when he tried to take away the trunk radio from the young people. Anton sings from the Gospel "Sometimes I Feel Like a Motherless Child", who previously played on the radio in the version of Richie Havens, and the group is part of the "Freedom" calls.

On Christmas Eve it comes to the scandal: Brother Krapp, the overseer, who apparently showed much understanding for the pupils, leaves the home. Apparently, he has sexually abused Mattis, who does not want to. At the service before Wolfgang got by Angelika in the bell bag the house key. With this he opens the door, but is posed by his father.

In the basement Wolfgang hangs on chains from the ceiling; Barely conscious, he has visions. When he was shown in the opening credits with his mother in an exhilarating mood on the beach, an incestuous relationship is indicated in this scene.

In a conflict in the moor, Wolfgang injures Bruder Wilde's eye with the spade. He uses the situation to flee with Anton. They find themselves from the moor, and come in a horse transport to Osnabrück. It turns out that Anton does not even come from there and does not have any parents either; Wolfgang does not take him home. Meanwhile his mother and his stepfather got a child. Soon Brockmann appeared to take Wolfgang back to Freistatt; Anton had already been took up. Wolfgang's mother insists on watching the home. Arrived in Freistatt, the stepfather locks the car after Wolfgang has left. Although Wolfgang shows his wounds and implores him not to leave him there, the parents drive away in the car.

Brother Wilde takes revenge on Wolfgang, apparently burying him alive with the help of Bernd. Brockmann, the householder, appears unexpectedly and takes the unconscious Wolfgang out of the "grave". Angelika says good-bye to Wolfgang as she goes to Hamburg to study. It comes to tenderness until he tries to rape her.

When Anton hangs himself, the pupils attack Brother Wilde, who wants to go back to the agenda. When he was lying on the ground, the Heiminsassen fled in their night shirts, except for Wolfgang, who remained with Anton. His will seems to be broken, it adapts itself, and may, for example, call for roll calls in the morning. One day he is released, because his stepfather has been fatally injured. When he arrives at home and sees the child of his stepfather on the terrace, he goes back to the street without seeing his mother, with a piece of Hedgehog slice from the reception table. He borrows money from a former friend and slaps him as he wants to touch his cake. In the train with an ambiguous destination, he rattles past Freistatt and, from above, he watches the pupils on their draisine at the mire.

Cast
 Louis Hofmann as Wolfgang
 Alexander Held as Hausvater Brockmann
 Stephan Grossmann as Bruder Wilde
 Katharina Lorenz as Ingrid
 Max Riemelt as Bruder Krapp
 Uwe Bohm as Heinz
 Langston Uibel as Anton

References

External links
 

2015 films
2015 drama films
2010s German-language films
German drama films
Films set in West Germany
Films set in 1968
Films set in 1969
Films set in 1970
2010s German films